This is the list of notable stars in the constellation Apus, sorted by decreasing brightness.

See also 
 Lists of stars by constellation

References 

 
 
 
 

 

List
Apus